Louis Courtois (27 January 1938 – 3 April 2001) was a French bobsledder. He competed in the four-man event at the 1968 Winter Olympics, finishing 11th.

References

External links
 

1938 births
2001 deaths
French male bobsledders
Olympic bobsledders of France
Bobsledders at the 1968 Winter Olympics
Sportspeople from Isère